The year 625 BC was a year of the pre-Julian Roman calendar. In the Roman Empire, it was known as year 129 Ab urbe condita . The denomination 625 BC for this year has been used since the early medieval period, when the Anno Domini calendar era became the prevalent method in Europe for naming years.

Events
 Medes and Babylonians assert their independence from Assyria and attack Nineveh (approximate date).
 Orientalizing period of vases ends in Ancient Greece (approximate date).
 A wine pitcher (oenochoe) from Rhodes is finished, having been begun in 650 BC.

Births

Deaths
 Yuan Taotu, diplomat of the Chinese state of Chen

References